Austin Warren may refer to:

 Austin Warren (baseball) (born 1996), American baseball player
 Austin Warren (scholar) (1899–1986), American literary scholar